Galashki (Galaške) is a rural locality (a selo) in Sunzhensky District of the Republic of Ingushetia, Russia, located on the left bank of the Sunzha River near the border with the Republic of North Ossetia–Alania. Its population was about 9,000 people in 2009. Galashki forms the municipality of the rural settlement of Galashki as the only settlement in its composition.

Etymology 
The village is considered to have been founded by representatives of the Galay taip. The name Galashki, translated from the Ingush language, literally means “to the Galays”.

Geography 
Galashki is situated on the left bank of the Assa River, approximately 30 kilometers southwest of the regional center, Sunzha, and 32 kilometers southeast of the city of Magas (by road). The nearest settlements to Galashki are the village of Alkhasty to the north, the village of Dattykh to the northeast, the village of Muzhichi to the south, and the village of Komgaron to the southwest.

History 
In the second half of the 18th century (1770s), the German researcher J. A. Güldenstädt indicates Galashki among the total number of Ingush villages and districts. S. M. Bronevsky also mentioned Galashki as a village of the Ingush in 1823. Ten years later, I.F. Blaramberg indicated Galashki as Ingush village too in his fundamental work “Historical, topographical, statistical, ethnographic and military description of the Caucasus”, written in 1834 as a result of his business trip and expedition in the Caucasus. Gradually by the name of the village in the XIX century, in official and literary sources, the terms "Galash society" and "Galash people" are fixed, as one of the territorial societies of the Ingush.

The village was considered a large village in the foothills in the Caucasian Imamate and played an important strategic role, as it closed the exits from the mountains to the plain. During the existence of Caucasian Imamate, Galashki was the center of a separate Galashkinskoe naibstvo, which was ruled by naib Dudarov, and also Muhammad Anzorov-Mirza.

It was a site of two raids by Chechen separatists during the Second Chechen War, the Galashki ambush in 2000 (from Chechnya) and the Battle of Galashki in 2002 (from Georgia).

See also 
 Galashians
 Galashkinskoe Naibstvo

References

Bibliography 
 
 
 
 
 
 
 
 

Rural localities in Ingushetia